Emerado is a city in Grand Forks County, North Dakota, United States located near Grand Forks Air Force Base. It is part of the "Grand Forks, ND-MN Metropolitan Statistical Area" or "Greater Grand Forks". The population was 443 at the 2020 census. Grand Forks Air Force Base is located near Emerado.

Geography
Emerado is located at  (47.921538, -97.364216).

Education
Emerado Elementary School has students Pre-K through 8.  Students graduating on to High School can open enroll in any of the nearby schools (Grand Forks, Northwood, Larimore).  Emerado school provides bus service to Larimore High School only.  Emerado School has a breakfast program as well as an after-school program for the students.  Student enrollment is around a hundred students which offers students the comfort of a small school without taking away from their educational opportunities.

Demographics

2010 census
As of the census of 2010, there were 414 people, 184 households, and 119 families living in the city. The racial makeup of the city was 80.2% White, 4.6% African American, 7.0% Native American, 1.9% Asian, 1.9% from other races, and 4.3% from two or more races. Hispanic or Latino of any race were 7.2% of the population.

There were 184 households, of which 29.3% had children under the age of 18 living with them, 46.7% were married couples living together, 12.0% had a female householder with no husband present, 6.0% had a male householder with no wife present, and 35.3% were non-families. 31.5% of all households were made up of individuals, and 6.5% had someone living alone who was 65 years of age or older. The average household size was 2.25 and the average family size was 2.74.

The median age in the city was 39.1 years. 22% of residents were under the age of 18; 9.1% were between the ages of 18 and 24; 27.1% were from 25 to 44; 33.3% were from 45 to 64; and 8.5% were 65 years of age or older. The gender makeup of the city was 51.9% male and 48.1% female.

2000 census
As of the census of 2000, there were 510 people, 234 households, and 120 families living in the city. The population density was 1,632.6 people per square mile (635.2/km2). There were 328 housing units at an average density of 1,050.0 per square mile (408.5/km2). The racial makeup of the city was 76.27% White, 5.49% African American, 6.86% Native American, 3.14% Asian, 4.51% from other races, and 3.73% from two or more races. Hispanic or Latino of any race were 6.86% of the population.

There were 234 households, out of which 27.8% had children under the age of 18 living with them, 37.6% were married couples living together, 11.1% had a female householder with no husband present, and 48.3% were non-families. 38.9% of all households were made up of individuals, and 3.4% had someone living alone who was 65 years of age or older. The average household size was 2.18 and the average family size was 2.95.

In the city, the population was spread out, with 24.3% under the age of 18, 9.4% from 18 to 24, 40.2% from 25 to 44, 22.2% from 45 to 64, and 3.9% who were 65 years of age or older. The median age was 33 years. For every 100 females, there were 127.7 males. For every 100 females age 18 and over, there were 128.4 males.

The median income for a household in the city was $25,962, and the median income for a family was $33,750. Males had a median income of $24,844 versus $20,625 for females. The per capita income for the city was $17,477. About 22.0% of families and 22.9% of the population were below the poverty line, including 35.4% of those under age 18 and 33.3% of those age 65 or over.

Climate
This climatic region is typified by large seasonal temperature differences, with warm to hot (and often humid) summers and cold (sometimes severely cold) winters.  According to the Köppen Climate Classification system, Emerado has a humid continental climate, abbreviated "Dfb" on climate maps.

References

Cities in North Dakota
Cities in Grand Forks County, North Dakota
1855 establishments in the United States